Flora Don Wovschin (born 20 February 1923) was a suspected Soviet spy who later renounced her American citizenship.

Biography
Wovschin was born in New York City. Her mother was Maria Wicher and her stepfather was Enos Regnet Wicher. She attended the University of Wisconsin–Madison, Columbia University and Barnard College. At Barnard, she was active in the American Students Union and may have been a member of American Youth for Democracy. She attended Barnard College with Marion Davis Berdecio and Judith Coplon, both of whom Wovschin later recruited into service for the NKVD.

From 9 September 1943 to 20 February 1945, she worked in the Office of War Information, then transferred to the Department of State. She resigned from the State Department 20 September 1945. Wovschin acted as courier between Coplon and Soviet intelligence. Wovschin transmitted to the Soviet Union the information that the Americans had somehow become aware of NKVD internal codenames for various American institutions, including CLUB, HOUSE, BANK and CABARET, as used in the NKVD's most secret communications. After the war, she renounced her American citizenship and travelled to the Soviet Union where she married a Soviet engineer. An FBI counterintelligence report on Wovschin has a hand-written note in the margin stating she may have died serving as a nurse in North Korea. Her code name in Soviet intelligence and in the Venona project is "Zora".

Sources
NSA Venona Collection
Bernard Schuster and Joseph Katz: KGB Master Spies in the United States

1923 births
Possibly living people
Barnard College alumni
Espionage in the United States
Jewish-American history
American spies for the Soviet Union
American people in the Venona papers
American defectors to the Soviet Union
Former United States citizens
People of the United States Office of War Information
American women civilians in World War II